Cézanne's Quarry, a crime novel by Barbara Corrado Pope, is set in France during the Belle Époque.

Plot
Hallie Ephron of the Boston Globe summarized the plot of Cézanne's Quarry: Cézanne's Quarry opens with the murder of Solange Vernet, the woman with whom Pope imagines Cézanne became besotted. With experienced judges away on summer holiday, the investigation falls in the lap of Bernard Martin ("a judge with little experience and no family or connections in the South of France")... [Murder suspects] Westerbury and Cézanne are a study in contrasts – one a scientist who studies the mountains, the other an artist who paints them. Martin, growing into his role as investigator, becomes convinced that neither man is responsible. The ending delivers a satisfying twist.

Major themes
Charles Sowerwine wrote,"Pope starts each book with an historical moment which offers a context for exploring issues of class, gender and social justice." Hallie Ephron characterized the novel as "a thoughtful exploration of science and religion, of old values and new, and of a woman's place in the world". A review by the Historical Novels Society identified the subjects of the novel: "art, politics (of the Third Republic), love, the meaning of friendship, and the relationship between science and religion".

Development history

Publication history
 2008, by Pegasus Books in the United States, Pub date (17 April 2008). Reprint edition, (22 September 2009).

Explanation of the novel's title
According to Sowerwine, the novel's title is a play on the word quarry, referring to the quarry at Bibémus that Cézanne painted, which is the location of the murder; and it also refers to the central question of the novel, whether Cézanne's obsession with a beautiful woman made her his quarry.

Reception
Critics praised Cézanne's Quarry for its vivid historical details, and Ephron said it "received immediate critical acclaim...",  calling it a "highly accomplished, compelling novel". Margaret Donsbach of Historical Novels Info said, "Cézanne's Quarry is an insightful, psychologically astute debut novel," but commented on the slow pacing: "...it could have benefited from editing". Sowerwine commented that didacticism — explaining the historical and sociological contexts — slowed the plot, though he concluded these "asides do make valid points and illuminate Bernard’s personality".

Awards and nominations
Cézanne's Quarry was nominated for the Oregon Book Award.

See also 
 The Blood of Lorraine
 The Missing Italian Girl

References

External links 
 

2008 American novels
American historical novels
American crime novels
Novels set in France
Books by Barbara Corrado Pope
Belle Époque